is a railway station on the Muroran Main Line in Muroran, Hokkaido, Japan, operated by Hokkaido Railway Company (JR Hokkaido).

Lines

Station layout 
The station has two island platforms serving four tracks.

Platforms

Adjacent stations

Limited express services
 Super Hokuto ( - )
 Suzuran ( - )

History
The station opened on 1 August 1892. With the privatization of Japanese National Railways (JNR) on 1 April 1987, the station came under the control of JR Hokkaido.

Surrounding area 
 Muroran police station
 Higashi-Muroran Post office

See also
 List of railway stations in Japan

External links

 Station map 

Railway stations in Hokkaido Prefecture
Stations of Hokkaido Railway Company
Railway stations in Japan opened in 1892